A non-blocking linked list is an example of non-blocking data structures designed to implement a linked list in shared memory using synchronization primitives:
 Compare-and-swap
 Fetch-and-add
 Load-link/store-conditional

Several strategies for implementing non-blocking lists have been suggested.

Review: linked lists
(Singly) linked lists are fundamental data structures that are widely used as is, or to build other data structures. They consist of "nodes", or "links", that are put in some order indicated by a "next" pointer on each node. The last node in the list (the "tail") has a  next pointer. The first node (the "head") is a sentinel: it stores no interesting information and is only used for its  pointer.

The operations that must be supported on lists are as follows.

 Given a node  that is not yet part of the list, and a pointer  to a node in the list (perhaps the head), insert  after .
 Given a pointer , delete  from the list.

Both operations must support concurrent use: two or more threads of execution must be able to perform insertions and deletions without interfering with each other's work (see diagram).

Harris's solution

In a 2001 paper, Harris gives a solution to concurrent maintenance of ordered linked list that is non-blocking, using a compare-and-swap primitive. Insertion of  after  is simple:

 
 
 

The naive solution of resetting this pointer with a single CAS runs the risk of losing data when another thread is simultaneously inserting (see diagram). The first marks the pointer  as deleted, changing its value but in such a way that the original pointer can still be reconstructed. The second actually deletes the node by resetting .

Operations on lock-free linked lists

Insert
search for the right spot in the list
insert using Compare-and-swap

Delete
search for the right spot in the list
delete using Compare-and-swap

Contains
search for a specific value in the list and return whether it is present or not
this is a read only operation, does not pose any concurrency issues

Problems

Concurrent insert and delete

a process deleting node B requires an atomic action on the node's predecessor
  concurrently another process tries to insert a node C after node B (B.next=C)
 node B is deleted from the list but C is gone along with it

Solutions
 Harris 
 place a 'mark'  in the next pointer of the soon-to-be deleted node
 fail when we try to CAS the 'mark'
 when detected go back to start of the list and restart
 Zhang et al.
 search the list to see if the value to be deleted exists, if exists mark the node logically deleted
 a subsequent traversal of the list will do garbage collection of logically deleted nodes

Concurrent deletions

 two processes concurrently delete an adjacent node: node B and node C respectively
 the delete of node C is undone by the delete of node B

Solutions
Valois 
 make use of auxiliary nodes which contain only a next field
 each regular node must have an auxiliary node as its predecessor and successor
 deletion will result in an extra auxiliary node being left behind, which means the delete will have to keep trying to clean up the extra auxiliary nodes
 use an extra 'back_link' field so the delete operation can traverse back to a node that has not been deleted from the list

Further reading
 High Performance Dynamic Lock-Free Hash Tables and List-Based Sets, Maged M. Michael
 
 Two-handed emulation: how to build non-blocking implementations of complex data-structures using DCAS, Michael Greewald
 Highly-Concurrent Multi-word Synchronization, Hagit Attiya, Eshcar Hillel
 Lock-free deques and doubly linked lists, Håkan Sundell, Philippas Tsigas

References

Linked lists